Polygala crucianelloides is a species of flowering plant in the family Polygalaceae. It is endemic to the Dominican Republic and Puerto Rico.

References

crucianelloides